The Australian Federation of AIDS Organisations (AFAO), an Australian non-profit organisation, is the national federation for the community response to HIV in Australia. AFAO advocates for its member organisations, promotes medical and social research into HIV/AIDS and its effects, develops and formulates policy on HIV/AIDS issues, and provides HIV policy advice to Commonwealth, State and Territory Governments.


Membership
AFAO’s members are:
 the eight State and Territory AIDS Councils;
 the National Association of People with HIV Australia (NAPWHA);
 the Australian Injecting and Illicit Drug Users League (AIVL);
 Anwernekenhe National Aboriginal & Torres Strait Islander HIV/AIDS Alliance (ANA); and
 Scarlet Alliance, Australian Sex Workers Association.

Internationally, AFAO contributes to the development of effective policy and program responses to HIV/AIDS at the global level, particularly in the Asia Pacific region.

Affiliations

AFAO is a founding member of the National LGBTI Health Alliance.

References 

HIV/AIDS organizations
HIV/AIDS in Australia
1987 establishments in Australia
Medical and health organisations based in Australia